Puta is a settlement and municipality in Baku, Azerbaijan.  It has a population of 1,253. Puta hosts the main naval base of the Azerbaijani Navy. The Puta Base is the largest military facility in the Caspian Sea basin.

References 

Populated places in Baku